Kozhinskaya is a rural locality (a village) in Moseyevskoye Rural Settlement, Totemsky  District, Vologda Oblast, Russia. The population was 10 as of 2002.

Geography 
Kozhinskaya is located 35 km northwest of Totma (the district's administrative centre) by road. Fominskaya is the nearest rural locality.

References 

Rural localities in Tarnogsky District